The Second Coming Tour may refer to:

 The Second Coming Tour (D'Angelo)
 The Second Coming Tour (Faith No More)